Skyline High School is a public high school in Millcreek, Utah, United States. Skyline High School serves ninth, tenth, eleventh, and twelfth graders. The school opened in 1962 and is administered by the Granite School District.

Admission to Skyline High School is open enrollment.  Students are neither required to take an admission exam nor need to live within the boundaries set by the administering district. Academically, it is one of only seven Utah schools to offer the IB Diploma Program, along with Hillcrest High School, and West High School. Skyline's music and drama programs have received statewide recognition. The debate program is also ranked at the region and state levels. Since the school's establishment, fourteen Skyline students have been selected as US Presidential Scholars.

Location and Campus 

Originally built in 1962, the Skyline High School is a 0.15 km² (0.06 mi²) medium-sized campus located at the mouth of Millcreek Canyon, just west of I-215. It includes soccer, softball, baseball, and football fields, as well as tennis courts. The school has 677 student parking stalls, and 28 faculty only parking stalls.

The campus is divided into six different buildings: A, B, C, D, a preschool, and an auxiliary gym/pool. The A building is the main academic building, and with 63 classrooms, it is the largest building on the campus. The B building has a cafeteria, auditorium, gym, and three classrooms, while the C and D buildings include seven classrooms and an auto shop.

Athletics
Skyline High School's athletic program includes 37 teams covering 22 sports. The teams are known as the "Skyline Eagles" and are a part of the Utah High School Activities Association. Skyline has an athletic rivalry with neighboring Olympus High School.

Football 
When the school was first established in 1962, many of the incoming seniors were given the choice of remaining at their old school, Olympus High School, or moving to the new school, Skyline. Because most of the seniors chose to remain at Olympus High, the majority of Skyline's 1963 football team was made up of sophomores and juniors. The first year was difficult for Skyline, but by the late sixties the football program had improved and had won two state championships in 1967 and 1969. Throughout the seventies Skyline's football program continued to be successful and won four state championships in 1970, 1976, 1977, and 1979. During this period Skyline was led by head coach Ken Schmidt, who later became the defensive coordinator for the BYU Cougars, and assistant coach Ron Haun.

In the 1990s, Skyline's football program was led by head coach Roger Dupaix and played once again in the state playoffs. In 1999, Skyline football won a fifth consecutive 5A state title and was ranked 24th in the nation by USA Today. Overall, the Eagles have been football state champions fourteen times (1967, 1969, 1970, 1976, 1977, 1979, 1990, 1993, 1995, 1996, 1997, 1998, 1999, and 2005).  In 2005 the team went into the playoffs as the fourth-ranked team in the region, where they rallied to win four straight games, beating rival Brighton High School in the state championship game.

Skyline's rivals are the Olympus Titans, a rivalry known as one of the state's greatest. The two schools play for a traveling trophy known as "The Rock". This football-shaped rock is painted the colors of the winning school and is displayed in the school's trophy case until the two teams meet up next. Skyline currently leads the series 27-26-1.

Basketball 
Skyline won state basketball championships in 1976 and 1977.  The 1977 team was ranked nationally as the fifth-best team in America, with a record of 26-1.

Women's tennis 
Skyline's women's tennis team has been state champions for three consecutive years in 2009-5A, 2010-5A, and 2011-4A; they took second in 2008-5A. Skyline was one of the original 5A schools, when 5A was established in Utah in 1993, but due to decreasing student enrollment, was moved to the 4A program in 2011.

Swimming 
Skyline's swim teams hold a seven-year dynasty (2001–08) at the state competition. Head coach Rod Horton spent 12 years with Skyline and won nine swimming state championships. In 2005 Mr. Horton retired from Skyline High School to become Vice Principal at Taylorsville High School—another school in the Granite School District.
Mr. Horton was replaced by Joe Pereira in 2005. Mr. Pereira moved to Skyline High School after a successful coaching career with Cyprus High School. Skyline swimming continued under Mr. Pereira to win three state championships, and eight second place finishes for both the men and women.

Lacrosse 
Skyline's lacrosse team had its inaugural season as an independent team in the spring of 1997. Due to a lack of participation in 1996, they competed jointly with Brighton High School.  The team has been a contender for the state championship on a number of occasions. In 2005 Skyline won the state championship.

Track and field 
In 2006, 2008, and 2009 Skyline won the 4x800 meter relay at the Davis High School Track and Field Invitational. The cross country team won their 5A region, both boys' and girls' teams, in 2009.

Ice hockey 
Skyline's hockey team won the 2010 state championship over Viewmont High School, and went on to finish in the top 15 at the USA Hockey High School National Championships held in Chicago, Illinois.  The hockey team repeated the win in 2011 in a 3-2 overtime victory over Bingham High School.

Wrestling 
Skyline's wrestling team went undefeated in region duals for three years (2006–09).

Water Polo 
Skyline men and women won state titles in water polo three years in a row (2002, 2003, and 2004), under coach Rod Horton.

Baseball 
Skyline's baseball team won the 1991 American Legion State Championship. Skyline won the state championship in 2012.

Soccer 
Skyline's men's soccer team won the 4A state championship in 2014 and 2015.

Academics
Skyline is one of just seven schools in Utah to offer the IB Diploma Programme, along with Hillcrest High School, Bountiful High School, West High School, Clearfield High School, Highland High School, and Provo High School. It is also the only school in the Granite School District to offer this program.

Skyline High School was ranked as the number 5 high school and number 1 traditional public school in the state of Utah by US News in 2020.

Skyline's math team has repeatedly earned recognition at a state and national level.  In the 2009 Team Scramble competition, Skyline tied for thirteenth place nationally, and placed fourteenth nationally in the 2009 Ciphering Time Trials competition.  In the 2010 Four-by-Four competition, Skyline also placed fourteenth, and four Skyline students placed third nationally in the Scissors Division.  In the 2008–2009 Mandelbrot Team Play Competition, Skyline tied for eleventh place nationally.  In the 2010 Utah State Math Contest, Skyline placed first in the 12th grade for the 5A category, and individual Skyline students placed first in 10th grade and first and second in 12th grade.

Skyline garnered much attention in November 2012 for being the first high school in the world to participate in SC's Student Cluster Competition in the LittleFe Track. They took home an honorable mention for "coming out of nowhere and taking the lead for a significant amount of time". They competed against universities, including the University of Utah and Slippery Rock University from Pennsylvania.

Newspaper
Skyline's school newspaper is The Horizon, a quarterly printed publication, with new articles on their website once a week.  The staff generally consists of six editors and numerous staff writers.  The Horizon has four sections: news, opinion, feature, and sports.

Renovation  (2019-present) 

In May 2019, the Granite School District announced a site layout for a rebuild of Skyline High School. Beginning in November 2019  and scheduled to end in December 2025, the school will be rebuilt while still in session. The school will include new grass and turf fields, tennis courts, pool, stadium, and baseball stadium, as well as a renovated softball field.

Notable alumni
 Tony Bergstrom, NFL football player for Washington Redskins
 Justin Braun, soccer player for Major League Soccer team Real Salt Lake
 Algie Brown, football player
 John Curtis, U.S. representative for Utah's 3rd congressional district
 Brandon Doman, BYU and San Francisco 49ers quarterback, offensive coordinator and quarterbacks coach at BYU
 Dan Farr, Salt Lake Comic Con co-founder
 Jared Goldberg, Olympic skier
 Daniel Hashimoto, animator, creator of Action Movie Kid web series
 Shalaya Kipp, middle distance runner, 2012 Summer Olympics, 3000 meter steeplechase
 Gretchen W. McClain, CEO of Xylem Inc. and former NASA deputy associate administrator for space development
 Craig Richard Nelson, Broadway and Hollywood actor, director, and singer
 Tenny Palepoi, NFL player for Los Angeles Chargers
 J. A. C. Redford, Hollywood musician and composer
George Theodore, American baseball player for New York Mets
 Danny Vranes, All-American University of Utah and Philadelphia 76ers basketball player
 Sharlene Wells Hawkes, Miss America 1985
 Peter Yanowitz, drummer for The Wallflowers, Natalie Merchant, and Morningwood

Gallery

See also

 List of high schools in Utah

References

External links

 
 Other information on Skyline High School 
 The Baccalaureate, Skyline's IB News Journal
 Skyline historical game-by-game football results since 1980

Public high schools in Utah
International Baccalaureate schools in Utah
Educational institutions established in 1962
Millcreek, Utah
1962 establishments in Utah